A Unique Spring is a 1957 Soviet drama film directed by Aleksandr Stolper and starring Yevgeniya Kozyreva, Izolda Izvitskaya and Aleksandr Mikhaylov.

Plot
A young archaeologist couple who have just married, arrives in Central Asia for the excavations. The plague which has broken out separates them for some time and causes the girl's mother to seek help from her ex-husband.

Cast
 Yevgeniya Kozyreva as Elena  
 Izolda Izvitskaya as Anna Burova  
 Aleksandr Mikhaylov as Yevgeny Burov  
 Ivan Dmitriev as Aleksandr Novozhilov  
 Irina Skobtseva as Claudia Novozhilova  
 Svetlana Kharitonova as Masha  
 Nina Doroshina as Nina  
 Viktor Sharlakhov as Gulyaev  
 Leonid Parkhomenko as Brëkhov  
 Takhir Sabirov as Sakhat  
 Yevgeny Leonov as Alexey Koshelev  
 Boris Bityukov as Officer PPC 
 Daniil Netrebin as Kuzya

References

Bibliography 
 Rollberg, Peter. Historical Dictionary of Russian and Soviet Cinema. Scarecrow Press, 2008.

External links 
 

1957 films
Soviet drama films
1957 drama films
1950s Russian-language films
Films directed by Aleksandr Stolper
Mosfilm films